Chocho  (also Chocholtec, Chocholteco Chochotec, Chochon, or Ngigua) is a language of the Popolocan branch of the Oto-Manguean language family spoken in Mexico in the following communities of Oaxaca: San Miguel Chicahua (settlement of Llano Seco), Teotongo (settlements of El Progreso, El Tecomate, Guadalupe, and La Luz), San Miguel Huautla (settlement of Ocotlán), Santa Magdalena Jicotlán (settlements of San Mateo Tlapiltepec, and Santiago Tepetlapa), San Pedro Nopala (settlements of San Mateo Tlapiltepec, and Santa María Jicotlán), San Miguel Tequixtepec (settlement of Los Batos), San Francisco Teopan (settlements of Concepción Buenavista, Santiago Ihuitlán Plumas, Tepelmeme Villa de Morelos, and Tlacotepec Plumas), Ocotlán (settlements of Boquerón, San Antonio Nduayaco, Tierra Colorada, and Unión Palo Solo), Santa María Nativitas (settlements of Barrio Nicolás, Barrio Santiago, El Mirador, El Porvenir, Loma del Tepejillo, Pie del Cordoncillo, Primera Sección (Santa Cruz), San José Monte Verde, San Pedro Buenavista, and Santa María Nativitas), San Juan Bautista Coixtlahuaca (settlements of El Capulín (Sección Primera), El Tepozón (Sección Segunda), El Zapotal (Sección Tercera), La Mulata, and Santa Catarina Ocotlán), and San Miguel Tulancingo (settlements of Agua Dulce, Buena Vista, El Coatillo, El Español, Gasucho, Loma Larga, Rancho Marino Sánchez, and San Miguel Tulancingo). Chocho is Spoken by 770 speakers (1998 Ethnologue Survey).

Phonology

Consonants

Vowels 

 Vowel sounds /  / can have lax allophones of [  ].

Chocho is a tonal language distinguishing low, mid and high tones.

Grammar 
Carol Mock (1982) argues that Chocho distinguishes morphosyntactically between subjects of willful actions whether they are transitive or intransitive and subjects of unwillful actions. This results in her analysing Chocho as an active–stative language.

As an example of how this works here is an example showing that the subject is marked with a different suffix depending on whether the action of the verb is active or inactive

In an active/voluntary transitive phrase the agent/subject is marked by the active suffix "-á" and the patient by the  inactive clitic "-mī". The patient/subject of an intransitive active/voluntary phrase is marked by the same suffix.

However in an involuntary/inactive intransitive phrase the subject/patient is marked with the inactive clitic "má" like an object/patient of a transitive phrase.

This morphosyntactic alignment would imply Chocho is a Split-S type active language. However, some intransitive verbs can use either the active person suffixes or the inactive enclitic, this suggests that it does in fact belong to the Fluid-S type active language.

References

Annette Veerman-Leichsenring. 2000. Gramática del Chocho de Santa Catarina Ocotlán, Oaxaca. (CNWS Publications, 86.) Leiden: Research School of Asian, African and Amerindian Studies (CNWS), Universiteit Leiden. xiii+140pp.
Mock, Carol C, 1982, Los Casos Morfosintacticos del Chocho. Anales de Antropología, (Instituto de investigaciónes Antropologicas, UNAM) 19(2): 345-378. (Cited from  Thomas C Smith and Fermin Tapia: "El Amuzgo como lengua activa" In Paulette Levy Ed. "Del Cora al Maya Yucateco" UNAM 2002)
Mock, Carol. 1977. Chocho: Santa Catarina Ocotlán, Oaxaca. (Archivo de Lenguas Indígenas de México, 4.) Mexico: Centro de Investigación para la Integración Social. 175pp.

External links
 ELAR archive of Preliminary Documentation and Description of Chocholtec

Mesoamerican languages
Indigenous languages of Mexico
Oto-Manguean languages
Popolocan languages
Endangered Oto-Manguean languages